Megadenus voeltzkovi is a species of sea snail, a marine gastropod mollusk in the family Eulimidae.

References

External links
 To World Register of Marine Species

Eulimidae
Gastropods described in 1914